Saint-Aubin-de-Luigné is a former commune in the Maine-et-Loire department in western France. On 31 December 2015, it was merged into the new commune Val-du-Layon.

This rural village, located in the deep valley of Layon and in the Loire Valley, is classified as a UNESCO World Heritage Site. It has an important mining past linked to the exploitation of the Lower Loire Coal Basin.

A wine-growing town, its territory is located in the Coteaux du Layon appellation (AOC).

Geography
This Angevin village in the west of France, is located on the northern border of the Mauges on the way from Chaudefonds-sur-Layon to Rochefort-sur-Loire.

The territory of the Mauges is a small area that covers part of southwest Maine-et-Loire bounded by the waterways of the Loire in the north and the Layon in the east.

See also
Communes of the Maine-et-Loire department

References

Saintaubindeluigne